Streamliners are streamlined trains. Streamliners could also be:

 Streamliners (Illinois Terminal Railroad), three equipment sets owned by the Illinois Terminal Railroad
 Hal Roach's Streamliners, a set of comedy films directed by Hal Roach
 The Streamliners, a former band in the Royal Canadian Air Force